Events from the year 1816 in Scotland.

Incumbents

Law officers 
 Lord Advocate – Archibald Colquhoun; then Alexander Maconochie
 Solicitor General for Scotland – Alexander Maconochie; then James Wedderburn

Judiciary 
 Lord President of the Court of Session – Lord Granton
 Lord Justice General – The Duke of Montrose
 Lord Justice Clerk – Lord Boyle

Events 
 April – Highland Clearances: Factor Patrick Sellar is tried but acquitted at Inverness of culpable homicide during the mass expulsion of crofting tenants from Strathnaver in 1814.
 21 May – Highland Society of London (established 1778) incorporated by Act of Parliament.
 18 June – causeway, bridge and sluice across Loch Fleet at The Mound, designed by Thomas Telford, completed.
 13 August – an earthquake in Inverness is the strongest ever in Scotland.
 1 September – the Northern Lighthouse Board's new light on the Isle of May, designed by Robert Stevenson, is completed.
 The Nelson Monument, Edinburgh, on Calton Hill, is completed.
 Logie Bridge at Ferness completed to a design by Telford; as also is the bridge at Contin and the harbour at Portmahomack.
 Suspension footbridge erected over the Gala Water in Galashiels and upper arch bridge at Rumbling Bridge completed.
 David Brewster discovers stress birefringence.
 Rev. Robert Stirling obtains a U.K. patent for the Stirling hot air engine.
 Lagavulin distillery established on Islay.
 St Andrew's Cathedral, Glasgow, is completed as the city's first post-Reformation Roman Catholic church (architect: James Gillespie Graham).
 First Jewish community in Edinburgh in modern times established.
 The Edinburgh Races and Caledonian Hunt are held for the first time at Musselburgh Racecourse rather than on the sands of Leith.

Births 
 5 January
 James Brunlees, civil engineer (died 1892)
 Daniel Wilson, archaeologist and academic (died 1892 in Canada)
 11 January – Henry Robertson, railway promoter (died 1888 in Wales)
 3 February – Archibald McKellar, politician in Ontario (died 1894 in Canada)
 14 February – James Morison, evangelical (died 1893)
 13 June – Charles Alexander, merchant and politician in Quebec (died 1905 in Canada)
 1 September – James Drummond, historical painter and curator (died 1877)
 16 September – Theodore Martin, writer (died 1909)
 30 September – Archibald Sturrock, steam locomotive engineer (died 1909)
 12 October – Alexander Bryson, scientist (died 1866)

Deaths 
 22 February – Adam Ferguson, philosopher and historian (born 1723)
 28 February – Archibald Bruce, theologian (born 1746)
 14 June – Allan Maconochie, jurist (born 1748)
 25 December – Hercules Ross, merchant in Jamaica (born 1745)

The arts
 Walter Scott's novels The Antiquary, The Black Dwarf and Old Mortality are published.
 The Elgin Marbles are purchased by the British government from Thomas Bruce, 7th Earl of Elgin, for the British Museum in London.

See also 
 Timeline of Scottish history
 1816 in the United Kingdom

References 

 
Scotland
Years of the 19th century in Scotland
1810s in Scotland